Pseudopostega lateriplicata is a moth of the family Opostegidae. It is only known from the La Selva Biological Reserve, a lowland rainforest area in north-eastern Costa Rica.

The length of the forewings is about 1.9 mm. Adults are mostly white with white forewing marked with a small, pale brown, dorsal spot just below middle of dorsal margin. Adults have been collected in March.

Etymology
The species name is derived from the Latin lateris (side) and plica (fold) in reference to the prominent, lateral folds on the male gnathos.

External links
A Revision of the New World Plant-Mining Moths of the Family Opostegidae (Lepidoptera: Nepticuloidea)

Opostegidae
Moths described in 2007